Arvid Andersson may refer to:

Arvid Andersson (tug of war) (1881–1956), tug-of-war competitor who won a gold medal for Sweden at the 1912 Summer Olympics
Arvid Andersson-Holtman (1896–1992), gymnast who won a gold medal for Sweden at the 1920 Summer Olympics
Arvid Andersson (weightlifter) (1919–2011), weightlifter who represented Sweden at two Summer Olympic Games
Folke Alnevik (born 1919), full name Arvid Folke Alnevik-Andersson, athlete who won a bronze medal for Sweden at the 1948 Summer Olympics